Penicillium adametzii is an anamorph fungus species of the genus of Penicillium.

See also
List of Penicillium species

References

Further reading

 
 
 
 

adametzii
Fungi described in 1927